Kaire is a village in Barnala district in the Indian state of Punjab. It is a very small village with a total population of 1641 inhabitants in the East Punjab. The village has a local school (which instructs up to 12th class), a veterinary hospital, a water tank, and a grain market. The village 15km away from the Barnala district.

Demographics

 India census, Kaire had a population of 1641. Males constitute 52% of the population and females 48%. Kaire has an average literacy rate of 61%, lower than the national average of 74.04%: male literacy is 66.3%, and female literacy is 43.5%

References

Villages in Barnala district